Finalmente l'alba (also titled Finally Dawn and Finally, Dawn Has Come) is an upcoming Italian drama film written and directed by Saverio Costanzo and starring Lily James, Willem Dafoe and Joe Keery.

Cast
Lily James as Josephine Esperanto 
Willem Dafoe as Rufus Priori
Joe Keery as Sean Lockwood
Rachel Sennott as Egyptian princess
Rebecca Antonaci as Mimosa 
Enzo Casertano as Rinaldo

Production
On August 29, 2022, it was announced filming began in Italy.  In October 2022, it was announced that filming wrapped.

References

External links
 

Upcoming films
Films shot in Italy